Phalaenopsis pallens is an endemic species of orchid from the Philippines.

External links 
 
 

pallens
Orchids of the Philippines
Plants described in 1860